Magnus Skavhaug Nergaard (born 20 November 1989 in Tranby, Norway) is a Norwegian Jazz musician (upright bass & bass guitar), known from bands like Monkey Plot, Mummu, Ronja and Ich Bin N!ntendo.

Career 
Nergaard is a graduate of the Department of improvisation and jazz at Norwegian Academy of Music in Oslo (2013). His musical genres span over musical landscapes from improvised music, to rock and noise, often influenced by different kinds of world folk-music, and always trying out new approaches to create exciting new combinations.

Nergaard collaborated on the album release Ich Bin N!ntendo & Mats Gustafsson (2012) including Joakim Heibø Johansen (drums) and Christian Skår Winther (guitar), featuring Mats Olof Gustafsson (baritone saxophone). Within the trio Monkey Plot including Christian Skår Winther (guitar) and Jan Martin Gismervik (drums and percussion), he released the latest album Løv Og Lette Vimpler (2013).

Mummu is a new Norwegian musical band comprised from the female duo Skrap including Anja Lauvdal (Korg MS10), Heida Karine Johannesdottir Mobeck (tuba), and the male trio Ich Bin N!ntendo, including Christian Skår Winther (guitar) and Joakim Heibø Johansen (drums).

Discography 

Within Ich Bin N!ntendo
2012: Ich Bin N!ntendo & Mats Gustafsson (Va Fongool)
2014: "Look" (Va Fongool)

Within Karokh
2013: "Karokh" (Loyal Label)

Within Mummu 
2013: Mitt Ferieparadis (Va Fangool)

Within Monkey Plot
2013: Løv Og Lette Vimpler (Gigafon)
2015: Angående omstendigheter som ikke lar seg nedtegne (Hubro) 

Within Ronja
2013: Il Calebrone (Havtorn Records)

References

External links 

1989 births
Musicians from Ålesund
Living people
Norwegian jazz composers
Jazz double-bassists
Norwegian jazz upright-bassists
Male double-bassists
Avant-garde jazz musicians
Norwegian Academy of Music alumni
21st-century double-bassists
21st-century Norwegian male musicians
Monkey Plot members